Vishwanath is a 1996 Tamil-language thriller film directed by K. Goutham. The film stars Saravanan, Mohini and Swathi, with Radha Ravi, Prakash Raj, Manivannan, Senthil and Sindhu playing supporting roles. It was released on 16 August 1996.

Plot 

The film starts with the convict Vishwanath escaping from jail. Vishwanath is searched by the whole state, his photo is on the front pages of every newspaper. One day, Swathi sees him near her house, fear of him, she runs away. Swathi lives with her sister Sindhu in a bungalow. One day, her sister falls unconscious and Vishwanath checks her like a doctor. Vishwanath then tells Sindhu about his tragic past.

In the past, Vishwanath was a doctor working in a clinic owned by Michael, a greedy hospital owner. They both clashed, there was a difference of opinion between them : Michael gave more importance for money, whereas Vishwanath gave more importance for human life. Vishwanath resigned from his work and got an offer from a better hospital. Thereafter, Michael's hospital was in bankrupt while Vishwanath's hospital was gaining in popularity. Under debts, Michael decided to treat illegally terrorists in his clinic and got a huge amount of money to treat them. With the help of the terrorists, Michael hid weapons in Vishwanath's hospital, thereafter Vishwanath was arrested for 'illegal possession of weapons' in his hospital. Michael even killed the innocent doctor Jenifer to hide the truth behind his illegal activities.

The police officer Rajkumar is charged to catch the convict Vishwanath. In the meantime, Swathi falls in love with Vishwanath. What transpires next forms the rest of the story.

Cast 

Saravanan as Vishwanath
Mohini as Jenifer
Swathi as Swathi
Radha Ravi as Rajkumar
Prakash Raj as Michael
Manivannan as Narayanan
Senthil as Shankarlal
Sindhu as Sindhu
T. S. Raghavendra
V. Gopalakrishnan
Idichapuli Selvaraj as Selvaraj
Karuppu Subbiah as Khadir Bhai
Thideer Kannaiah
Kumarimuthu
Mahanadi Shankar as David
Arulmani
Jyothi Meena as an item number

Soundtrack 

The film score and the soundtrack were composed by Deva. The soundtrack, released in 1996, features 5 tracks with lyrics written by Vaali.

References 

1996 films
1990s Tamil-language films
1996 action thriller films
Films scored by Deva (composer)
Indian action thriller films